Charles Spencer Storms, known as Charlie Storms (1823–1881) was a professional gunfighter and gambler of the Old West, who is best known for having been killed in a gunfight with Luke Short in Tombstone, Arizona.

Early life 

Charlie Storms was born in New York, as is shown by public records. Storms was reported by the Tombstone Epitaph to have been in California during the Gold Rush of 1849, which is corroborated by an entry in the 1852 California state census for the city of Sacramento, that lists 29-year-old "Chas. S. Storms", a laborer born in New York who had last lived in Mexico.

Gambler and gunfighter 

He had a reputation as being a skilled gunman during the 1870s and afterward, and traveled to many towns throughout the Old West as a gambler. He drifted from place to place, including Deer Lodge, Virginia City, Leadville, and Dodge City, and Deadwood, during which time he was involved in at least three shooting incidents. When Wild Bill Hickok was murdered by Jack McCall in Deadwood, South Dakota, Storms was reportedly in town at the same time, and  he was rumored to have stolen one of Hickok's pistols as a souvenir, although this was never proven.

He left El Paso, Texas, and arrived in Tombstone in 1881. He was a well-known gambler and frequented saloons in town.

Fatal argument 

On February 25, 1881, Storms had been drinking all night and made several rude remarks to faro dealer Luke Short in the Oriental Saloon. Storms had successfully defended himself several times with his pistol. He had inaccurately sized Short up as someone who, according to Bat Masterson, he could "slap in the face without expecting a return." Masterson knew both men.

Short shot Storms in the chest twice at point-blank range, setting his shirt on fire. Short reportedly told Bat Masterson, "You sure pick some of the damnedest friends, Bat".

Tombstone physician George E. Goodfellow was only a few feet from Storms when he was killed. "In the spring of 1881, I was a few feet distant from a couple of individuals [Luke Short and Charlie Storms] who were quarreling. They began shooting. The first shot took effect, as was afterward ascertained, in the left breast of one of them, who, after being shot, and while staggering back some 12 feet, cocked and fired his pistol twice, his second shot going into the air, for by that time he was on his back." He found two thicknesses of silk wrapped around the bullet and two tears where it had struck the vertebral column.

Examining Storms afterward, Goodfellow found that he had been shot in the heart, but was surprised to see "not a drop of blood" exiting the wound. He discovered that the bullet had ripped through the man's clothes and into a folded silk handkerchief in his breast pocket. He extracted the intact bullet from the wound with the silk wrapped around it. As a result of what he learned, Goodfellow began experimenting with the first designs for bullet-resistant clothing made of multiple layers of silk.

Short was arrested by Tombstone City Marshal Ben Sippy for killing Storms. During the preliminary hearing, Masterson testified that Short acted in  self defense, so Short was released. The Arizona Weekly reported that Storms was around 60 years old and that he was survived by a widow in San Francisco. The 1870 Census returns lists a Mrs. Mary Storms, aged 40, born at sea, residing in the same San Francisco household with Charles Storms, along with two brothers Henry and George Goodman, aged 24 and 16, respectively, who may have been her sons from an earlier marriage. The San Francisco Call for November 26, 1903, at page 15 lists the death notice of "Mrs. Mary Storms," aged 84, who died on November 24 at the University Mound Ladies Home, an assisted-care living facility for elderly women.

References

Gunslingers of the American Old West
1881 deaths
American gamblers
American frontier
1823 births